"Survival" is a song by Canadian rapper Drake from his album, Scorpion (2018), the song has reached the top 20 in Canada, Portugal, and the United States.

Composition
"Survival" is a hip hop song that contains samples from Claude Larson's song "Telex" (1980).

Commercial performance

North America
On July 14, 2018, "Survival" entered the Billboard Canadian Hot 100 chart at number 18 on and remained in the top 100 until July 28, 2018. The song spent two weeks on the US Billboard Hot 100, entering the chart at number 17, its immediate peak, on July 14, 2018.

Internationally
The song has peaked in the top 40 in Greece, the Netherlands, Portugal and has charted on the charts of Austria, Czech Republic, France, Germany, Italy,  Slovakia, and Sweden.

Charts

References

2018 songs
Drake (musician) songs
Songs written by Drake (musician)
Songs written by 40 (record producer)
Songs written by No I.D.